A purse bid is an initial step in arranging a professional boxing match, involving the fight's/card's promoter(s). All interested registered promoters may bid on the amount of the purse (the total money that the fighters will be paid for the match), if the sides representing each fighter fail to agree on it before the deadline. The highest offer wins; however, the winning entity must produce a small percentage of the total amount up-front by a certain date. The purse in a purse bid is split between the fighters according to the preset formulas of the sanctioning commissions. Purse bids are often won by one of the two fighters' promoters.

For championship belt fights under a given sanctioning body (WBC, WBA, WBO, IBF, etc), the two fighters' (champion and challenger) promoters/managers usually get together to establish an agreement for how much each side will receive. In situations where the two sides can't agree, it will sometimes go to a "purse bid" where the process is opened up to any promoter that would like to put on the fight. They submit bids for how much they're willing to pay in purses and the highest bidder wins the right to put on the fight. In such cases, the champion usually gets a higher percentage and the challenger a lower percentage and the total purse is simply split between the two by formula.

For example, in the summer of 2015 the WBA heavyweight champion was Wladimir Klitschko and the WBA wanted him to fight his mandatory challenger, Tyson Fury. The two sides (K2 Promotions for Klitschko and Mick Hennessey for Fury) were initially unable to come to an agreement on terms for a fight. The WBA then ordered a purse bid, which would have allowed any promoter to submit bids to put the fight on themselves. Just before the purse bid was going to open up, the two sides announced they had come to an agreement and so the purse bid was canceled.

References

Boxing
Payments